The Nalganga Dam is an earthfill dam on the Nalganga River near Malkapur, Buldhana district, in the state of Maharashtra in India.

Specifications

Purpose
 Irrigation

See also
 Dams in Maharashtra
 List of reservoirs and dams in India

References

Dams in Buldhana district
Dams completed in 1967
1967 establishments in Maharashtra